Safiqoli Beg, later known as Safiqoli Khan (d. 1679), was a Safavid official and gholam of Georgian origin, who served as the governor (beglarbeg) of Mashhad from 1664 to 1666, and of the Erivan Province (also known as Chokhur-e Sa'd) from 1674 to 1679. 

A scion of the Saakadze family, Safiqoli was a son of the former sepahsalar (commander-in-chief), Rostam Khan (c. 1588 – 1 March 1643) and a brother of Bijan Beg, sometime governor of the Azerbaijan Province. Safiqoli Khan also served for some time as Divan-beigi (chancellor, chief justice).

Safiqoli had a son named Rostam, another high-ranking Saakadze figure, and a namesake to Safiqoli's father.

Sources
  
 
  
 
 

1679 deaths
Safavid governors of Erivan
Safavid governors of Mashhad
Iranian people of Georgian descent
Shia Muslims from Georgia (country)
Safavid generals
17th-century people of Safavid Iran
Divan-beigi
Safavid ghilman